Lutheran Theological Southern Seminary (LTSS) is a theological seminary of the Evangelical Lutheran Church in America (ELCA) and located in Columbia, South Carolina. It offers theological degrees. In 2012, it merged with Lenoir-Rhyne University, also affiliated with the ELCA. Although Lenoir-Rhyne is based in Hickory, North Carolina, LTSS operates as a satellite campus in Columbia.

History

LTSS was founded in 1830 to help serve the needs of educating pastors for Lutheran Churches in the South. Rev. John Bachman was the first to call for the formation of a seminary, and LTSS owes much of its existence to his impassioned call for a place to educate future pastors. Originally, the campus was located in Pomaria, South Carolina. The first class graduated in 1834 and consisted of one person, Fredrick F. Harris. Harris was not awarded a degree, but was later ordained and thus is considered to be the first "graduate" of the seminary. The first people receiving degrees were William Berly, Elijah Hawkins, and P.A. Strobel, all of whom graduated in 1836.

In 1834, the school was relocated to Lexington, South Carolina, where it remained from 1834 to 1856. A surviving building from that period is the Hazelius House. The seminary maintained continuous enrollment until the time of the Civil War, when the entire student body, at this time consisting of exactly three students, left the school to join the Confederate Army. Only one, Jefferson A. Sligh, survived the conflict, and though he never returned to complete his degree, he was eventually ordained by the South Carolina Synod. The seminary was again closed in 1865 due to a lack of students, but was reopened the following year.

In 1868 the seminary was again relocated, this time to Walhalla, South Carolina. The move was temporary as in 1872 the seminary was moved once again to Salem, Virginia, where it would remain until 1884. LTSS was again moved in 1885, this time to Newberry, South Carolina, to the campus of Newberry College, a four-year college sponsored by the South Carolina Synod. In 1903, LTSS was moved to Mt. Pleasant, South Carolina, near Charleston, and was moved once more to Columbia, South Carolina, in 1911 where it remains today. Its first building, Beam Hall, was built on the highest point in Columbia, Seminary Ridge.

Accreditation
Lenoir-Rhyne University is accredited by the Southern Association of Colleges and Schools (SACS). LTSS has the further accreditation of its program from the Association of Theological Schools in the United States and Canada. In 2021, the ATS reaccredited seminary programs for a ten-year term.

Student body
LTSS is a seminary of the Evangelical Lutheran Church in America. The student body is predominantly ELCA, with a significant number of United Methodists and Baptists. LTSS has a long history of being ecumenically committed. In the last two decades, the number of students and faculty from other Christian denominations has grown to nearly half of the student body. The seminary has both Baptist studies and Methodist studies course concentrations available.

Academics
LTSS awards three degrees: the Master of Divinity (M.Div.), the Master of Arts in Christian Ministry (M.A.C.M.), and the Master of Theological Studies (M.T.S.) The majority of students at LTSS are enrolled in a program of study leading to the M.Div. degree as it is required by the ELCA for ordination as a Minister of Word and Sacrament. Some students enrolled in the M.A.C.M. program are ELCA candidates for ordination as a Minister of Word and Service.

References

External links
 

Seminaries and theological colleges in South Carolina
Educational institutions established in 1830
Lutheran seminaries
Education in Columbia, South Carolina
Buildings and structures in Columbia, South Carolina
1830 establishments in South Carolina